Orania adiastolos is a species of sea snail, a marine gastropod mollusk in the family Muricidae, the murex snails or rock snails.

Description

Distribution
This marine species occurs off New Caledonia, Fiji and Tonga; North Zululand, South Africa

References

 Houart, R. (2020). The Orania fischeriana complex in the Indo-West Pacific and description of a new Cytharomorula species (Gastropoda, Muricidae, Ergalataxinae) from Hawaii. Novapex. 21 (4): 97-106.
 Liu, J.Y. [Ruiyu] (ed.). (2008). Checklist of marine biota of China seas. China Science Press. 1267 pp
  Houart, R.; Kilburn, R. N. & Marais, A. P. (2010). Muricidae. pp. 176-270, in: Marais A.P. & Seccombe A.D. (eds), Identification guide to the seashells of South Africa. Volume 1. Groenkloof: Centre for Molluscan Studies. 376 pp

External links
 R. (1995). The Ergalataxinae (Gastropoda, Muricidae) from the New Caledonia region with some comments on the subfamily and the description of thirteen new species from the Indo-West Pacific. Bulletin du Muséum National d'Histoire Naturelle, Paris. ser. 4, 16 (A, 2-4): 245-297

Orania (gastropod)
Gastropods described in 1995